Richard Royal Alexander, known as Royal Alexander (born February 18, 1966), is an attorney, writer, and former politician in his native Shreveport, Louisiana. In 2007, he was the  Republican candidate for Louisiana Attorney General. In addition to his law practice, Alexander is an opinion writer, a guest lecturer at public events and education forums, and a frequent guest on various TV and radio outlets.

Education and career

The fifth of twelve children born to a prominent Shreveport businessman, Alexander was educated in private elementary and secondary schools.  He received his Bachelor of Arts degree from Louisiana State University in Shreveport. He obtained his Juris Doctor degree from Oklahoma City University School of Law where he served on Law Review and Moot Court, both intramural and on the Benton National Moot Court Team.

Alexander was a staff member to the late U.S. Representative Clyde C. Holloway of Louisiana's 8th congressional district, since disbanded, who also served as chairman of the Louisiana Public Service Commission. He was also a member of the Republican State Central Committee of Louisiana from 2008-2012.

Race for attorney general

Caddo Parish assessor candidacy

According to KTBS-TV, ABC in Shreveport, an independent survey of property tax rates around the state by the demographer Elliott Stonecipher concludes that Shreveport and Caddo Parish residents pay the highest such taxes of any metropolitan area in Louisiana. Alexander said that the assessments are inflated and had pledged had he been elected to reduce them.

References

External links
http://www.royalalexander.org/about.php

1966 births
Living people
Louisiana lawyers
Louisiana Republicans
Louisiana State University Shreveport alumni
Oklahoma City University School of Law alumni
Politicians from Shreveport, Louisiana
Political chiefs of staff
United States congressional aides